Persatuan Sepakbola Indonesia Ternate or abbreviated Persiter is an Indonesian football club based in Ternate. They currently compete in the Liga 3 and their home stadium is Gelora Kie Raha.

Coaching staff

References

External links
 Profile at PSSI

 
Association football clubs established in 1958
1958 establishments in Indonesia
Football clubs in Indonesia
Football clubs in North Maluku